Alfred Robert Quinton (28 October 1853 – 10 December 1934) was an English watercolour artist, known for his paintings of British villages and landscapes many of which were published as postcards.

Quinton was born in Peckham, London, in 1853, the youngest of seven children of Elizabeth née Cullum (1818-1886) and John Allen Quinton (1817-1906), a printer, author and journalist. On leaving school A. R. Quinton studied painting at the Heatherley School of Fine Art following which he worked as a steel engraver, but deciding on a career in art he began to work in oils in about 1874 and after in watercolour, working from a studio in Fleet Street in London and after at Lincoln's Inn, exhibiting several of his watercolour paintings at the latter with the Ipswich Fine Art Club in 1882 and 1883. From 1877 Quinton exhibited watercolours at the Royal Society of British Artists.

He married Elizabeth Annie Crompton (1858-1946) at Bolton in Lancashire in May 1885 and with her had two sons: Leonard Quinton (1886-1981) and Edgar Allan Quinton (1891-1912).

In 1895 he and a friend cycled from Land's End to John O'Groats and Quinton's artworks from the trip were after serialised in the Illustrated Sporting and Dramatic News. His artwork became more in demand and he was able to buy a house with a studio in Finchley in London. His work routine would be to travel around England and Wales for three months of the year, mostly during the summer months and often by bicycle, during which he would draw sketches and take photographs of locations which he would work up into paintings in his studio during the winter months. Many of his artworks were published as postcards by Raphael Tuck and J Salmon Ltd which remain popular with today's collectors. His paintings have also been published in many calendars. Well over 2,000 of his paintings were published between 1904 and the time of his death. He also illustrated a number of books including The Historic Thames by Hilaire Belloc.

He exhibited at the Birmingham Royal Society of British Artists; Dudley Gallery; Dowdeswell Gallery; Grosvenor Gallery; Liverpool Walker Art Gallery; Manchester City Art Gallery; the Royal Society of British Artists; Royal Hibernian Academy; Royal Institute of Painters in Water Colour and the Royal Institute of Oil Painters. He exhibited at the Royal Academy but he was later banned from exhibiting there  as the authorities were not in favour of his 'commercialisation' of art. His original illustrations for the book The Historic Thames and two other of his paintings were bought by the Duke and Duchess of Kent.

Alfred Robert Quinton died in Finchley, London, in December 1934, and left £9,228 2s 8d in his will to his widow and his surviving son.

Illustrated books

Belloc, Hilaire. The Historic Thames (J. M. Dent & Co. 1907).
Bradley, A. G. The Avon and Shakespeare's Country (E. P. Dutton & Co. 1910).
Ditchfield, P. H. The Cottages and the Village Life of Rural England (J. M. Dent & Sons Ltd, 1912).
Rhys, Ernest. The Old Country: A book of love & praise of England (J. M. Dent & Sons Ltd, 1922).

References

Further reading
Quinton, A. R. The Rural England of A.R.Quinton (J. Salmon Ltd. 1990)

External links

Picture Postcards by A. R. Quinton (collections.co.uk).

19th-century English painters
English male painters
20th-century English painters
Landscape artists
Postcard artists
1853 births
1934 deaths
English watercolourists
19th-century English male artists
People from Peckham
Alumni of the Heatherley School of Fine Art
20th-century English male artists